Night at the Museum: Kahmunrah Rises Again (also known as Night at the Museum 4: Kahmunrah Rises Again) is a 2022 animated film directed by Matt Danner and written by Ray DeLaurentis and William Schifrin. The sequel to Secret of the Tomb (2014), it is the first animated film in the Night at the Museum film series and the fourth installment overall, as well as the first animated feature film produced by Atomic Cartoons. The film follows Nick Daley, the son of Larry Daley, as he becomes night guard at the Museum of Natural History. In addition to Nick Daley, it also features Kahmunrah, the antagonist of the second film (2009).

Unlike the live-action films, 1492 Pictures is not involved with the film. Night at the Museum: Kahmunrah Rises Again was released on December 9, 2022, on Disney+.

Plot
The exhibitions of the American Museum of Natural History scare away the latest guard, much to Larry Daley's displeasure. Teddy Roosevelt and Sacagawea tell him that they would prefer that his son, Nick, take over the position and after some reluctance Larry agrees. Nick himself is struggling as he wants to join the school's jazz recital by being their DJ and so that he can be close to his crush Mia. Despite his teacher Ms. Montefusco seeing promise in him, Nick believes he has failed. Larry explains to Nick that while he will be guarding the History Museum in Japan, he will be filling in for him at home. Nick thinks he will fail, but Larry manages to get his ex-wife Erica to also agree to it.

Nick is reunited with the rest of the gang including Rexy, Attila, Jedediah, Octavius, Laaa, Dexter the monkey, and Joan of Arc. His first task is to lock the storage room in the basement, but after encountering all the creepy things downstairs, uses a statue to block the door and runs away in fear. Kamunrah, who was locked away, breaks free and steals the tablet that brings the exhibitions to life in an effort to rule the world. A chase ensues through the museum, but he manages to escape. Nick and his friends take off after him while Rexy stays behind to guard the museum. While outside, Joan has a vision showing her that Kamunrah is headed to the Museum of Natural Art where an exhibition on the Temple of Dendur is being held.

The group catch up to Kamunrah and chase him through the art museum. As backup, Kamunrah brings to life the God of Chaos, Seth who uses his powers to keep the Larry and the others at bay. They find the painting that leads to ancient Egypt and enter it. With only a couple of hours until sunrise, Nick and his friends enter the painting as well. While traversing the Nile, Nick begins to feel hopeless as Kamunrah's escape was his fault, but the group give him encouragement. They eventually arrive at Dendur and avoid a series of traps before reaching Kamunrah and Seth who plan to use the tablet, by playing three notes, to unleash the Egyptian army of jackals on them.

A fight in the temple ensues with Nick finally overcoming his insecurities. He plays the notes in reverse which causes the tablet to suck away the jackals, Seth and Kamunrah. Nick and his friends escape, but the sun is already rising. Remembering that has a poster of the Museum that Sacagawea gave him earlier, they use it to head back home just in time. Nick finally has the confidence in himself to try out for the jazz recital again, this time with success, starts dating Mia and accepts his position as the new night guard at the museum.

Voice cast

Humans

 Joshua Bassett as Nick Daley, the son of Larry Daley, and the newest security guard at the American Museum of Natural History.
 Jamie Demetriou as Dr. McPhee, the director of the Museum of Natural History and Larry's former boss.
 Gillian Jacobs as Erica Daley, Larry's former wife and Nick's mother.
 Zachary Levi as Larry Daley, Nick's father, Erica's former husband, and the previous security guard of the museum.
 Shelby Simmons as Mia, Nick’s girlfriend
 Tenzing Norgay Trainor as Bodhi, a student at Nick's school.
 Lidia Porto as Ms. Montefusco, Nick’s music teacher
 Bowen Yang as Ronnie, a night guard at the museum who quits after only a few minutes

Exhibits

 Thomas Lennon as Theodore Roosevelt, the wax sculpture of the 26th President of the United States. Lennon previously portrayed Orville Wright in the second film.
 Zachary Levi as Laaa, a Neanderthal who was made to resemble Larry.
 Alice Isaaz as Joan of Arc, the statue of the woman, who led the French in war against the English, and sees visions of the future.
 Jack Whitehall as Octavius, a Roman soldier miniature and Jedediah's best friend.
 Steve Zahn as Jedediah, a cowboy diorama miniature and Octavius' best friend.
 Joseph Kamal as Kahmunrah, a pharaoh who is Ahkmenrah's older brother, and seeks revenge from Larry.
 Alexander Salamat as Attila the Hun, the statue of the leader of the Huns.
 Kieran Sequoia as Sacagawea, the polyurethane model of the Lemhi Shoshone woman who is Theodore Roosevelt's girlfriend.
 Akmal Saleh as Seth, the Egyptian God of Chaos who helps Kahmunrah with his quest, to conquer the world.
 Chris Parnell as George Washington, the 1st President of the United States. He appears in the famous painting "Washington Crossing the Delaware".
 Dee Bradley Baker as Dexter, a Capuchin monkey.
 Kelemete Misipeka as Moai, an Easter Island Head at the Museum of Natural History
 Jonathan Roumie as Merenkahre, the mummy of an ancient pharaoh and Kahmunrah's father.
 Zeeko Zaki as Ra, the Egyptian Sun God
 Jim Conroy as Alexander Hamilton, an American military officer who aided George Washington. He appears in the famous painting "Washington Crossing the Delaware".

Production

Development
In 2016, it was reported that a remake of Night at the Museum was in development from Alibaba Pictures Group. By August 2018, then-CEO of 20th Century Fox Stacey Snider announced that a television series based on Night at the Museum was in development instead. In August 2019, after the acquisition of 21st Century Fox by Disney, the project was confirmed to be still in development as a Disney+ exclusive film.

In October 2020, it was reported that an animated film titled Night at the Museum: Kahmunrah Rises Again was in development. The plot centers around Larry's son, Nick, who is hesitant to follow in his father's footsteps as nightwatchman. In addition to Nick and Kahmunrah, the film will also feature other returning characters: Jedediah, Octavius, Theodore "Teddy" Roosevelt and Sacagawea, with the addition of Joan of Arc. In August 2021, Shawn Levy said that the film would debut on Disney+ in 2022. In September 2022, Matt Danner revealed he was directing the film; he previously was the creator and showrunner of the Disney animated show Legend of the Three Caballeros (2018). Several crew members from Legend of the Three Caballeros worked on the film, with Danner describing it as a "spiritual successor" to the series. In November 2022, the release date of December 9, 2022 was revealed.

Animation
The animation was handled by Atomic Cartoons, using the same style they used from their previous work, Little Demon, enhancing lighting and character rigging. The film has a 2D animation style, making it the first 2D animated film released under Walt Disney Pictures since Winnie the Pooh.

Music
In March 2022, John Paesano revealed that he was composing the film. By August 29, 2022, Paesano was confirmed as composer, replacing Alan Silvestri from the first three films.

Release
The film was exclusively released on Disney+ on December 9, 2022 after being delayed from a 2021 release. This film was released under the Walt Disney Pictures banner instead of 20th Century Studios.

Reception
On the review aggregator site Rotten Tomatoes, the film holds a 71% based on reviews from 14 critics, which makes it the highest critically rated movie of the Night at the Museum franchise to date.

Notes

References

External links
 

2020s American animated films
2020s children's adventure films
2020s children's animated films
2020s English-language films
2022 animated films
2020s fantasy adventure films
2020s fantasy comedy films
2020s adventure comedy films
2022 films
21 Laps Entertainment films
Alibaba Pictures films
American children's animated adventure films
American children's animated comedy films
American fantasy adventure films
American animated fantasy films
Canadian animated feature films
Canadian fantasy comedy films
Canadian animated fantasy films
Canadian children's fantasy films
Canadian fantasy adventure films
Chinese children's films
Canadian children's animated films
Chinese adventure comedy films
Chinese fantasy adventure films
American sequel films
Chinese sequel films
Canadian sequel films
Chinese animated films
Disney+ original films
English-language Chinese films
English-language Canadian films
Chinese-language films
Night at the Museum
Films scored by John Paesano
Animated films based on children's books
Films based on children's books
Animated films set in New York City
Films set in museums
Cultural depictions of Theodore Roosevelt
Cultural depictions of Sacagawea
Cultural depictions of George Washington
Cultural depictions of Attila the Hun
Cultural depictions of Joan of Arc
Cultural depictions of Albert Einstein
Cultural depictions of Nefertiti
Walt Disney Pictures animated films
American animated comedy films
Canadian animated comedy films
American films about revenge